The 1929 Guilford Quakers football team represented Guilford College as an independent during the 1929 college football season. The season was one of the best in the school's history.

Schedule

References

Guilford
Guilford Quakers football seasons